James Nightingale (born 25 September 1986) is a former Papua New Guinea international rugby league footballer who played as a  forward for the Penrith Panthers in the NRL.

Background
James Nightingale was born in Penrith, New South Wales, Australia. James' eldest brother Matthew Nightingale (b. 23 July 1981) represented Papua New Guinea, played for the Penrith Panthers, Wests Tigers and the Parramatta Eels.

Playing career
He was named in the Papua New Guinea training squad for the 2008 Rugby League World Cup. He was then named in the PNG squad for the 2008 Rugby League World Cup.

Nightingale was named as part of the Papua New Guinea squad for the 2009 Pacific Cup.

He was also added as a replacement player in the PNG rugby league squad for the Four Nations tournament in 2010.

References

1986 births
Living people
Australian rugby league players
Australian people of Papua New Guinean descent
Papua New Guinea national rugby league team players
Redcliffe Dolphins players
Rugby league players from Penrith, New South Wales
Rugby league locks
Rugby league props
Rugby league second-rows
Windsor Wolves players